Alex Llompart (Alexander Gabriel Llompart Filardi) (born May 5, 1990) is a professional male tennis player from Puerto Rico.

Llompart reached his highest individual ranking on the ATP Tour on December 23, 2013, when he became World number 725.  He reached his highest doubles ranking on July 21, 2014, when he became World number 232.

Llompart is a member of the Puerto Rican Davis Cup team, having posted a 15–7 record in singles and a 6–5 record in doubles in twenty ties played since 2007.

Llompart has represented Puerto Rico in multiple international competitions.  Llompart partnered with countryman José Perdomo in the men's doubles competition at the 2010 Central American and Caribbean Games, winning the bronze medal.  He also partnered with countrywoman Monica Puig in the mixed doubles competition at the 2010 Central American and Caribbean Games, winning the bronze medal.  Llompart also represented Puerto Rico at the 2011 Pan American Games, reaching the second round in the men's singles competition and falling in the first round in the mixed doubles competition.

He is a seven-time Puerto Rico singles champion (2008–2014).

Doubles titles (5)

See also
 Carmelo Filardi
 Filardi House
 Vincente Filardi

References

External links
 
 
 
 

1990 births
Living people
Puerto Rican male tennis players
Sportspeople from San Juan, Puerto Rico
People from Weston, Florida
Tennis players at the 2011 Pan American Games
Pan American Games competitors for Puerto Rico
Central American and Caribbean Games bronze medalists for Puerto Rico
Competitors at the 2010 Central American and Caribbean Games
Central American and Caribbean Games medalists in tennis